Tamás Kiss (born 24 November 2000) is a Hungarian professional footballer who plays as a midfielder for Puskás Akadémia FC.

International career
He has played for Hungary internationally from U16 to U21 level.

He made his debut for Hungary national football team on 12 November 2021 in a World Cup qualifier against San Marino.

Career statistics

References

2000 births
Living people
Hungarian footballers
Association football midfielders
Hungary youth international footballers
Hungary under-21 international footballers
Hungary international footballers
Szombathelyi Haladás footballers
Puskás Akadémia FC players
Csákvári TK players
Diósgyőri VTK players
SC Cambuur players
Nemzeti Bajnokság I players
Nemzeti Bajnokság II players
Eredivisie players
Hungarian expatriate footballers
Expatriate footballers in the Netherlands
Hungarian expatriate sportspeople in the Netherlands
Sportspeople from Győr